Sar Sardab-e Olya (also Romanized as Sar Sardāb-e ‘Olyā; also known as Sar Sardāb-e Bālā) is a village in Seyyedvaliyeddin Rural District, Sardasht District, Dezful County, Khuzestan Province, Iran. At the 2006 census, its population was 66, in 10 families.

References 

Populated places in Dezful County